Promethium compounds are compounds containing the element promethium, which normally take the +3 oxidation state. Promethium belongs to the cerium group of lanthanides and is chemically very similar to the neighboring elements. Because of its instability, chemical studies of promethium are incomplete. Even though a few compounds have been synthesized, they are not fully studied; in general, they tend to be pink or red in color. Treatment of acidic solutions containing Pm3+ ions with ammonia results in a gelatinous light-brown sediment of hydroxide, Pm(OH)3, which is insoluble in water. When dissolved in hydrochloric acid, a water-soluble yellow salt, PmCl3, is produced; similarly, when dissolved in nitric acid, a nitrate results, Pm(NO3)3. The latter is also well-soluble; when dried, it forms pink crystals, similar to Nd(NO3)3. The electron configuration for Pm3+ is [Xe] 4f4, and the color of the ion is pink. The ground state term symbol is 5I4. The sulfate is slightly soluble, like the other cerium group sulfates. Cell parameters have been calculated for its octahydrate; they lead to conclusion that the density of Pm2(SO4)3·8 H2O is 2.86 g/cm3. The oxalate, Pm2(C2O4)3·10 H2O, has the lowest solubility of all lanthanide oxalates.

Unlike the nitrate, the oxide is similar to the corresponding samarium salt and not the neodymium salt. As-synthesized, e.g. by heating the oxalate, it is a white or lavender-colored powder with disordered structure. This powder crystallizes in a cubic lattice upon heating to 600 °C. Further annealing at 800 °C and then at 1750 °C irreversibly transforms it to monoclinic and hexagonal phases, respectively, and the last two phases can be interconverted by adjusting the annealing time and temperature.

Promethium forms only one stable oxidation state, +3, in the form of ions; this is in line with other lanthanides. According to its position in the periodic table, the element cannot be expected to form stable +4 or +2 oxidation states; treating chemical compounds containing Pm3+ ions with strong oxidizing or reducing agents showed that the ion is not easily oxidized or reduced.

References 

Promethium
Promethium compounds
Chemical compounds by element